Edward A'Beckett may refer to:

Ted a'Beckett (1907–1989), or Edward Lambert a'Beckett, Australian cricketer
Edward a'Beckett (cricketer, born 1836) (1836–1922), Australian cricketer
Edward a'Beckett (cricketer, born 1940) (1940–2011), Australian cricketer

See also
Edward Beckett, 5th Baron Grimthorpe (born 1954), British peer